Ritmo is the title of the fifth album by the British singer-songwriter Judie Tzuke, released in September 1983. The album peaked at number 26 in the UK.

The album was Tzuke's second and final studio album to be released during her contract with Chrysalis Records. Originally only released on vinyl album and cassette, it was remastered and released on compact disc in 1994 by BGO Records.

Track listing
All tracks by Judie Tzuke, Mike Paxman and Paul Muggleton, except where indicated
Side one
 "Jeannie No" (Tzuke, Paxman) – 4:28
 "She Don't Live Here Anymore" – 4:04
 "Shoot from the Heart" (Tzuke, Paxman) – 4:46
 "Face to Face" – 5:15

Side two
"Another Country" – 2:56
 "Nighthawks" – 5:02
 "Walk Don't Walk" – 4:37
 "Push Push, Pull Pull" – 3:24
 "How Do I Feel" (Muggleton, Bob Noble) – 5:15

Personnel
Band members
Judie Tzuke – lead and backing vocals
Mike Paxman – guitar, percussion, backing vocals, producer
Bob Noble – keyboards
John "Rhino" Edwards – bass guitar
Andy Duncan – drums
Paul Muggleton – keyboards, percussion, backing vocals, producer

Additional musicians
Ray Russell – guitar
Don Snow, Roy White – keyboards, backing vocals
John Giblin – bass guitar
Graham Jarvis – drums
Morris Pert – percussion
Andy Sheppard – tenor and soprano saxophone
Jaqi Robinson – backing vocals

Production
John Hudson – engineer, mixing at Mayfair Studios, London
Simon Sullivan – engineer, mixing on "Push Push, Pull Pull"
Bob Parr – engineer
Jeff Titmus – engineer on "How Do I Feel"
Carb Canelle – assistant engineer
John Pasche – design
Brian Aris – cover photography

References

External links
Official website

Judie Tzuke albums
1983 albums
Albums produced by Mike Paxman
Chrysalis Records albums